Samuel Arredondo Kim (born January 17, 2002), better known by his stage name Samuel, is an American singer who was a part of the short-lived hip hop duo 1Punch in 2015.

In April 2017, he participated in the reality television series season 2 of Produce 101 during the first half of 2017. In the final episode, he ranked 18th and was not able to join the show's project group. One month after the show ended, he began his solo career as Samuel, with the release of his first EP Sixteen on August 2.

Early life 
Samuel was born in Los Angeles, California, to a Mexican father (José Arredondo) and a South Korean mother.

Career

2012–2013: Pre-debut 
Samuel made his first appearances to the public at the age of eleven, when he appeared in the live broadcast series Seventeen TV as a trainee under Pledis Entertainment. In 2013, he left the agency.

2015–2016: 1Punch and collaboration with Silentó 
In 2015, Samuel debuted as a part of hip-hop duo named 1Punch (with rapper One) under a collaboration between Brave Entertainment and D-Business Entertainment, taking "Punch" as his stage name. They debuted on January 23 with the release of "Turn Me Back", which is the title track of their album, The Anthem. Eight months later, One was scouted by YG Entertainment, leading to the disbandment of the duo. Under the name PUNCH, Samuel collaborated with Silentó to release the single "Spotlight" in 2016, for which they won the 26th Seoul Music Award for Global Collaboration. He later joined Silentó on tour in the US.

2017–present: Produce 101, solo debut and lawsuit 

In April 2017, Samuel participated in the second season of the popular survival show Produce 101 under his own name, representing Brave Entertainment. During the first elimination, he was ranked 2nd, but did not make the final cut for the 11-member team, finally ranking 18th overall. The result was met with surprise from many viewers, who had expected Samuel to become part of the lineup of Wanna One.

Samuel debuted as a solo artist on August 2. His debut mini album, Sixteen, was released on August 2, with the title track "Sixteen" featuring rapper Changmo.

Samuel's first full-length album, Eye Candy, was released on November 16, 2017, with a total of ten tracks including the lead single "Candy".

In December 2017, it was announced that Samuel had signed a contract with ‘Pony Canyon’ for his Japanese promotions.

Samuel officially debuted in Japan on February 7, 2018, with his first Japanese single, "Sixteen (Japanese Ver.)". The music video of "Sixteen (Japanese Ver.)" was released on January 18.

In March 2018, Samuel released his second mini album, One, with the title track "One" featuring BtoB member Jung Il-hoon.

In April 2018, Samuel released his second Japanese single, "Candy (Japanese Ver.)", on May 16. The music video of the track was released on May 2.

On May 30, 2018, Samuel released his repackaged album, Teenager, featuring Lee Ro Han, who was a runner-up to MNet's "School Rapper Season 2".

In the course of 2018, Samuel, together with Chinese singer Zhou Zhennan, collaborated and participated in Tencent's The Collaboration Season 2. The duo eventually placed first and won the competition.

On November 17, 2021, Samuel won a lawsuit against Brave Entertainment to terminate his contract.

Personal life 
On July 16, 2019, Samuel's father José Arredondo was found dead at his condo in Cabo San Lucas, Mexico. He died from blunt force trauma and stab wounds. Later in July of 2019, Mexican authorities arrested a suspect who was a family acquaintance and "friend of [Arredondo] for 20 years."

Discography

Studio albums

Extended plays

Singles

Soundtracks

Other appearances

Filmography

Reality shows

Television series

Radio shows

Awards and nominations

References

2002 births
Brave Entertainment artists
Living people
American K-pop singers
21st-century South Korean singers
South Korean child singers
South Korean male singers
South Korean male idols
South Korean pop singers
South Korean people of Mexican descent
Produce 101 contestants
American expatriates in South Korea
American musicians of Mexican descent
American musicians of Korean descent
American male pop singers
21st-century American singers
21st-century American male singers
Hanlim Multi Art School alumni
Singers from Los Angeles